Robert Somers Brookings (January 22, 1850 – November 15, 1932) was an American businessman and philanthropist, known for his involvement with Washington University in St. Louis and his founding of the Brookings Institution.

Early life
Robert Somers Brookings was born in Maryland to Dr. Richard and Mary Eliza (Carter) Brookings and grew up on the Little Elk Creek in Cecil County, near Baltimore. His father died when Robert was only two and money was scarce.

After one year of school, Brookings dropped out. At age 17, in 1867, he moved to St. Louis, Missouri to join his brother Harry as an employee of Cupples & Marston, wholesale dealers in household goods. Robert worked as a clerk and also moonlighted as a bookkeeper. He earned $25-a-month as a clerk and $10-a-month as a bookkeeper. Robert practiced sales techniques and convinced Samuel Cupples to give him a salesman position, known as a drummer.

Career 
Robert and his brother decided to start their own firm after four years of experience with Cupples & Marston. Cupples agreed to make Robert a partner instead of lose him to a new company. By 1872, Robert and Harry Brookings had become partners in the firm, and it prospered under their management. Brookings traveled the country for the company and Cupples dominated the woodenware trade. Brookings became a millionaire by the time he was thirty and was a vice-president at the company.

One of Brookings greatest accomplishments was the construction of Cupples Station, which was completed in 1895. Noticing that companies were paying to ship freight from railroads in the middle of St. Louis to warehouses along the river, Brookings had the idea to locate warehouses directly on the railroad, so trains could load and unload inside the warehouses themselves. Cupples Station had eighteen warehouses designed by William Eames and Thomas Young. A separate endeavor from Cupples & Marston, the Station revolutionized shipping in St. Louis and served as a model for other cities. Building the station required buying eight blocks of property, which brought the company near bankruptcy. No U.S. banks would loan Brookings the money, but a British bank saved him with a $3 million loan.

In 1895, Brookings, now financially secure, decided to focus on charitable and philanthropic endeavors. Brookings retired from business at forty-six. Brookings was interested in education as a way of helping others. He toyed with funding his own university, but decided to work with Washington University, which was under financial strain at the time. In November 1895, he became chairman of the board of trustees of Washington University, remaining on the board for the rest of his life and donating over $5 million ($82 million in 2017 dollars) to the school in cash and property. Brookings helped transform the small school into a leading university with national prominence. He secured funding for one hundred acres that would become the university's Hilltop Campus. The university's administration building, Brookings Hall, is named for him. By 1899, the university's endowment was stable. Brookings' friends, including William K. Bixby, Adolphus Busch, and Edward Mallinckrodt, assisted with the building campaign. All three have buildings named after them on the Washington University campus. Brookings rented out many of the new university buildings for the 1904 World's Fair. He also helped Washington University's medical school gain prominence and become one of the best in the country.

In 1917, President Woodrow Wilson appointed Brookings to the War Industries Board, and later named him chairman of its Price Fixing Committee. In this role, he was the liaison between the U.S. government and many different industries. The board's role was to unify efforts to supply and distribute goods and food for the military. Brookings was awarded the U.S. Distinguished Service Medal, the French Legion of Honor, and the Order of the Crown of Italy for his wartime work.

In 1916, Brookings became the first board chairman of the Institute for Government Research, an independent organization dedicated to political study. Years later, Brookings gained funds from the Carnegie Corporation to establish the Institute of Economics. In 1928, Brookings gave his own money to start a graduate school of economics and government. These three organizations later became the Brookings Institution in 1928. The Brookings Institution was influential on federal government including during the federal budget process in the 1920s and the 1986 Tax Reform Act. The Institution remains one of the leading think tanks in the United States. The organization's influence was so great in 1973 that President Nixon's administration plotted to burn it down.

Brookings wrote three books: Industrial Ownership (1925), Economic Democracy (1929), and The Way Forward (1932).
Brookings was a bachelor until he was seventy-seven. He built three mansions in St. Louis and also had a country estate. In 1927, he eloped with fifty-one-year-old Isabel January, much to the surprise of his friends. January and Brookings had known each other for years, and she contributed a building to the Washington University Law School and one as a headquarters for the Brookings Institution.

Personal life
Brookings married Isabel Valle January (1876–1965) of San Remo, Italy in 1927 at an Episcopal Church.

He died on November 15, 1932 in Washington, D.C. He is buried at Bellefontaine Cemetery in St. Louis.

Awards
Brookings was awarded honorary degrees from Yale University, Harvard University, the University of Missouri and Washington University.

References

External links
 Brookings Institution biography
 Three more biographical articles about Brookings (St. Louis University website)

1850 births
1932 deaths
American merchants
American philanthropists
Recipients of the Legion of Honour
Recipients of the Distinguished Service Medal (US Army)
Washington University in St. Louis people
Burials at Bellefontaine Cemetery
People from Cecil County, Maryland
Carnegie Endowment for International Peace
Brookings Institution people
Civilian recipients of the Distinguished Service Medal (United States)